Anton Yevgenyevich Matveyenko (born 3 September 1986) is a Belarusian professional footballer, who plays for Vitebsk.

External links

1986 births
Living people
People from Mogilev
Sportspeople from Mogilev Region
Belarusian footballers
Association football midfielders
Belarusian expatriate footballers
Expatriate footballers in Kazakhstan
FC Dnepr Mogilev players
FC Dinamo Minsk players
FC Gomel players
FC Torpedo-BelAZ Zhodino players
FC Kaisar players
FC Belshina Bobruisk players
FC Minsk players
FC Vitebsk players